Vahe-Vahian (Armenian: Վահէ-Վահեան), born Sarkis Abdalian (22 December 1908, Gürün Turkey, died in 1998, Beirut, Lebanon), was an Armenian poet, writer, editor, pedagogue and orator.

Personal life 

Vahe-Vahian was the fifth son of his parents; Hagop Abdalian, a merchant, and Azniv Vartabedian, who, with his two elder sisters and mother survived the Armenian genocide of 1915.  As a kid, Vahe-Vahian had been the ocular witness of the assassination of his two brothers and father, and those atrocious scenes haunted him the rest of his life.  After the many vicissitudes of his life, he completed his tertiary studies in 1930, with a BSc in Structural Engineering from the American University of Beirut. The next four years he taught physics and mathematics to the upper classes in Broumana High School, and then, in 1935 he was invited to Melkonian Institute of Education in Nicosia, Cyprus, as lecturer of Armenian language and literature.

In 1936, in Melkonian, Vahe-Vahian met Ashkhen Shadan, a fellow teacher, and got married in 1938.  They had three children, Tsolak, Vahram and Shogher.

The death of Ashkhen in 1955 left her husband consumed.  Vahe-Vahian, besides his daily occupation as a teacher to meet the needs of his family, was struggling at the time with the publication of Ani, an Armenian monthly of Literature and Art, which was interrupted for a while. In 1968, Vahe-Vahian published a series of poems dedicated to his departed wife under the title of Մատեան Սիրոյ եւ Մորմոքի (Book of Love and Grief).

In 1957 Vahe-Vahian remarried to Anahid Topjian, and they had a daughter Sheila (1958).  His book of poems, Ղօղանջ ու Մրմունջ Վերջալուսային (Twilight Chime and Murmur) (1990) is dedicated to Anahid for her affactionate and coddling support.

In 1976, Vahe-Vahian, for a second time, was devastated by the death of Vahram in a car-crash, and described his shock and grief in a book of 29 poems, Յուշարձան Վահրամիս (Monument in Memory to Vahram) (1977).  He first learned about the death of his son, when he was travelling around the United States and Canada on a fund raising mission for bereaved Armenians in Lebanon.

In his twenties, Vahe-Vahian had an emotionally intense sentimental life, appropriate to his young age.  In the third section "Intimate letters" of the book Բանաստեղծին Սիրտը (The Heart of the Poet) (2012), we encounter his first platonic love letter to Mrs. Lucie Potoukian (Tosbath), written at the age of 24.  Later, he, with a greater out-pouring of emotions, corresponds with the elder sister of Lucie, Siran Seza, a prose writer and the editor of newly publishedYeridasart Hayouhi  Երիտասարդ Հայուհի (The Young Armenian), and with Alice Sinanian. Chronologically, from the first and to the last letter addressed to Siran Seza (11 September 1935), these love letters demonstrate the noble, sincere and genuine sentiments of the author, written in the sweet resonance and the magnificent architecture of the Western Armenian language, different from the language of his other letters, and which can certainly be considered as a literary tour de force by itself.
From 1946 onwards to his death in 1998, Vahe-Vahian took the decision to live and stay in Lebanon, despite the continuous civil war in the area from 1975 to 1990, with the strong conviction that the dismantling of the Armenian Community in Lebanon would be the last blow of mercy to the Armenian Diaspora.

 Education 
His primary education in the local 'Armenian National School' in Gürün was interrupted in 1914 by the deportation. As a child he lived the terror of Turkish atrocities, which was occasionally reflected in his literature.

Surviving the Armenian genocide as an orphan, after having been forced out of Turkey, in 1919 he returned to Aintab at the armistice with his mother, where he attended the local 'Vartanian School'. In 1921 he finally settled in Aleppo (Syria), where he continued his studies at the Armenian Evangelical School, which later became the Aleppo College run by American missionaries. Still eager to learn, in 1925 he enrolled in the American University of Beirut where he gained a B.S. degree in Structural Engineering in 1930.

 Career 

In 1931 he commenced teaching Mathematics, Physics and Chemistry at Broumana Senior High School in Lebanon. In 1935 he was invited to assume the Armenian Language and Literature position vacated by Vahan Tekeyan at the Melkonian Educational Institute.

In the autumn of 1946 he moved to Beirut where he launched the monthly magazine 'Ani'  of Armenian Literature and Art acting as the editor for the next 9 years. Ani has served as a pacesetter in modern Armenian literature by introducing new works from Armenia to Diaspora readers, and nurturing young talents in the Diaspora.

In 1947 he was appointed part-time teacher of Armenian Language and Literature in senior high schools in Beirut, patronised by the Armenian General Benevolent Union (AGBU).

In 1964 he founded the 'Yervant Hussissian Armenology Institute' in Beirut, and held the position of Principal and lecturer of Armenian Language and Literature. Over the span of a decade, hundreds of Armenian teachers were educated to subsequently pursue their chosen profession at different Armenian institutions all over the world.

Holder of several social and cultural posts in the Armenian community, both in Cyprus and Lebanon, he was invited to Armenia on several occasions in 1946, 1975, 1978 and 1981 to participate in literary conferences, attended university celebrations of outstanding historical events and met with prolific Armenian writers of the time.

Always on the go, first in 1946 then in 1976, during the devastating situation of the Armenians at the start of the civil war in Lebanon, he was sent on a mission to the USA and Canada to undertake fundraising activities organised by the Central Committee of AGBU in America on behalf of bereaved Armenians in Lebanon.

In 1970, the Catholicosate of Antelias (Lebanon) presented him with the Gold Medal for his prolific career as an educator and a writer. He was also awarded, the order of Saint Mesrop Mashtots by Armenia's Cultural Ministry for his devotion to Armenian culture and heritage in 1981.

In 1955 and 1978 respectively, he edited and published with detailed prefaces, the works of eminent poets Madtheos Zarifian and Vahan Tekeyan.

 External links 
 Vahé-Vahian – Great Poet of W. Armenian Literature by Edwin Charles http://www.keghart.com/Charles-Vahian 
 A Monument to My Darling Vahram http://www.keghart.com/Vahe-Vahian-Vahramis 
 "The Poet's Heart" http://www.keghart.com/Attarian-Vahian 
 Վահէ-Վահեանի Աւանդը http://www.keghart.com/Vahe-Vahian-Legacy 
 «Բանաստեղծին Սիրտը» http://www.aaeurop.com/?p=14303

 Works 

 Poetry 

 Արեւ-անձրեւ (Sun-Rain), Beirut, 1933 
 Ոսկի կամուրջ (Golden Bridge), Beirut, 1946
 Ոսկի կամուրջ (Golden Bridge - poems, Memoirs and critics), Yerevan, 1958
 Մատեան սիրոյ եւ մորմոքի (Book of Love and Grief), Beirut, 1968
 Յուշարձան Վահրամիս (Monument in memory of Vahram, Beirut, 1977
 Հատընտիր (Selected Poems), Beirut, 1986 
 Ղօղանջ ու մրմունջ վերջալուսային (Twilight Chime and Murmur), Beirut, 1990;

 Prose 
 Յարալէզներու հաշտութիւնը (The Reconciliation of Arlez-Memoirs from a visit to the Motherland), Beirut, 1953
 Բերքահաւաք (Harvest - Essays in three volumes), Vol. I, Jerusalem, 1978, Vol. II, Beirut, 1987 & Vol. III Beirut, 1993

 Posthumous work 
 Հրաժեշտի քերթուածներ (Farewell Poems), Beirut (Lebanon), 2009
 Բանաստեղծին սիրտը. նամակներ (The Heart of the Poet - Private Letters), Beirut (Lebanon), 2012

 Editing 
 Հայ գրականութիւնը - պատմուածքներ, Vol. I (An Anthology of Armenian Literature - Short stories, Vol. I) Beirut (Lebanon), 1978
 Ծաղկաքաղ արձակի (An Anthology of Armenian Prose in three Volumes) Beirut (Lebanon), 1984, 1985 & 1988

 Translated works 
 Անծանօթ գլուխ-գործոցը (Le Chef-d'Oeuvre Inconnu by Honore de Balzac, from French original), Beirut (Lebanon), 1950
 Մարգարէն (The Prophet by Gebran Khalil Gebran, from the English original), Beirut (Lebanon), 1984
 Պարտիզպանը, Կիթանճալի եւ Մրգահաւաք (The Gardener, Gitanjali & Fruit-gethering by Rabindranath Tagore, from the English original), Beirut, 1985
 Տորիան Կրէյի պատկերը (The Picture of Dorian Gray'' by Oscar Wilde, from the English original), Beirut, (Lebanon), 1992

References

1908 births
1998 deaths
People from Gürün
20th-century Armenian poets
Armenian genocide survivors
Armenian-language writers
Turkish emigrants to Lebanon
Armenian-language poets
20th-century male writers
Date of death missing
Lebanese writers